Quilcas District is one of twenty-eight districts of the province Huancayo in Peru.

See also 
 Putkaqucha
 Waytapallana mountain range

References